Problepsis is a genus of moths in the family Geometridae.

Description
Palpi thick scaled and reaching just beyond the frons. Hindleg of male small, tibia dilated with a fold containing a tuft of long hair, where the first joint of tarsus dilated and large. Forewings with vein 3 from, or from before angle of cell. Vein 5 from somewhat above middle of discocellulars. Veins 7, 8, 9 and 10 stalked from before upper angle, and vein 11 anastomosing (fusing) slightly with them to form the areole. Hindwings from, or from before, angle of cell. Vein 5 from somewhat above middle of discocellulars and vein 6 from before upper angle.

Selected species
Problepsis achlyobathra Prout, 1928
Problepsis aegretta Felder & Rogenhofer, 1875
Problepsis albidior Prout, 1938
Problepsis apollinaria (Guenée, [1858])
Problepsis argentea Warren, 1900
Problepsis asira Wiltshire, 1982
Problepsis borneamagna Holloway, 1997
Problepsis centrophora (Prout, 1915)
Problepsis clemens Lucas, 1890
Problepsis conjunctiva Prout, 1917
Problepsis craspediata Warren, 1897
Problepsis crassinotata Prout, 1917
Problepsis deducta Herbulot, 1962
Problepsis deliaria Guenée, [1858]
Problepsis delphiaria Guenée, ([1858])
Problepsis diazoma Prout, 1938
Problepsis digammata Kirby, 1896
Problepsis discophora Fixsen, 1887
Problepsis erythra Wiltshire, 1982
Problepsis eucircota Prout, 1913
Problepsis evanida Prout, 1932
Problepsis exanimata Prout, 1935
Problepsis flavistigma Swinhoe, 1904
Problepsis herbuloti Viette, 1968
Problepsis insignita Prout, 1938
Problepsis korinchiana Rothschild, 1920
Problepsis latonaria Guenée, ([1858])
Problepsis longipannis Prout, 1917
Problepsis lucifimbria (Warren, 1902)
Problepsis magna Warren, 1906
Problepsis maxima Thierry-Mieg, 1905
Problepsis meroearia Saalmüller, 1884
Problepsis metallopictata (Pagenstecher, 1888)
Problepsis minuta Inoue, 1958
Problepsis mitis de Joannis, 1932
Problepsis neumanni Prout, 1932
Problepsis ocellata (Frivaldszky, 1845)
Problepsis ochripicta Warren, 1901
Problepsis paredra Prout, 1917
Problepsis phoebearia Erschoff, 1870
Problepsis plagiata (Butler, 1881)
Problepsis plenorbis Prout, 1917
Problepsis rorida Prout, 1932
Problepsis sancta Meyrick, 1888
Problepsis shirozui Inoue, 1986
Problepsis similinotata Prout, 1917
Problepsis subreferta Prout, 1935
Problepsis superans (Bulter, 1885)
Problepsis transposita Warren, 1903
Problepsis triocellata Bastelberger, 1908
Problepsis vulgaris Butler, 1889

References

External links

Scopulini
Geometridae genera